Vardanjan (also Romanized as Vardanjān; also known as Vardangūn, Vardaniān, and Wardangun) is a city in the Central District of Ben County, Chaharmahal and Bakhtiari province, Iran. At the 2006 census, its population was 4,262 in 1,023 households, when it was a village in Ben District of Shahrekord County and before Ben County was established. The following census in 2011 counted 4,324 people in 1,179 households, by which time the village had been elevated to the status of a city. The latest census in 2016 showed a population of 4,456 people in 1,329 households, and in the new Ben County. The city is populated by Persians.

References 

Ben County

Cities in Chaharmahal and Bakhtiari Province

Populated places in Chaharmahal and Bakhtiari Province

Populated places in Ben County